Katchou (real name Ali Nasri) was an Algerian singer, born on April 15, 1963 in Batna.

Career
He sang in Chaoui. He has published at least eight albums, and the following are regarded as the most well known.
The album Hey Demi includes the following song titles:
Hey demi demi
Yalala
Delali Delali
Hami Hami
Lali Lali
Ya Lala

The album Ana Wach Edani includes the titles:
Houzni Ala Bladi
Ya laoulia
Akal Akal
Wach li biya
Adjbouni Aynik
Ayounek
Tekabri ya lahmama
Rouhi ou arouahi
Ya lahwa
Ana wach dani
Haram Alik
Ghabet Lamouima

Death
He died August 12, 2009 between Ain Touta and Batna in a traffic accident.

References

1963 births
2009 deaths
20th-century Algerian  male singers
Chaoui people
21st-century Algerian  male  singers
Road incident deaths in Algeria
People from Batna, Algeria